"Marching Through Georgia" (sometimes spelled as "Marching Thru' Georgia" or "Marching Thro Georgia") is a marching song written by Henry Clay Work at the end of the American Civil War in 1865. The title and lyrics of the song refer to U.S. Army major general William T. Sherman's "March to the Sea" to capture the Confederate city of Savannah, Georgia in late 1864.

History
The song became widely popular with Union Army veterans after the American Civil War. The song, sung from the point of view of a Union soldier, tells of marching through Georgian territory, freeing slaves, meeting Southern Unionist men glad to once again see the U.S. flag, and punishing the Confederacy for their starting the war.

After the war, in parts of the southern United States, and particularly in Georgia, ex-Confederates and some white Southerners saw the song as a symbol of perceived excessive damage and political domination the United States army and government exercised over the former Confederacy and Southern states during the war. Coincidentally, Sherman himself came to dislike "Marching Through Georgia", in part because it was played at almost every public appearance that he attended. In fact, it was even played at his funeral. Outside of the Southern United States, it had a widespread appeal: Japanese troops sang it as they entered Port Arthur, the British Army sang it in India, and a British town welcomed southern U.S. troops in World War II with the tune.

Legacy

The song remains popular with brass bands, and its tune has been adapted to other popular songs, including the controversial anthem of Glasgow Rangers Football Club "Billy Boys" and "Come In, Come In". It was also sung by a black Northern transplant (or “carpetbagger,” the term used in pseudohistorical and fictional accounts aligned with the Lost Cause) played by Ernest Whitman in the film Gone with the Wind, and by Ann Sheridan in Dodge City.

In the 1896 presidential election, the campaigns of both William McKinley and William Jennings Bryan featured political songs sung to the tune of "Marching Through Georgia".

In the United Kingdom, the tune is used for the Georgist anthem, The Land, the de facto party song of the Liberal Democrats and of the former Liberal Party. Liberal Assemblies and Liberal Democrat Conferences were formerly closed with the song, and the song continues to be a favourite at the conference Glee Club. David Lloyd George used the tune for his campaign song George and Gladstone in his first election campaign in 1890.

An anglicised version of the song was recorded between 1901 and 1903 during the Second Anglo Boer War. This version, although almost identical, included alternate lyrics and was issued as "Marching On Pretoria" on the Zonophone label.

George M. Cohan referenced the "Hurrah! Hurrah!" line in one of the verses of "You're a Grand Old Flag", juxtaposed with a line from "Dixie".

In Japan, the song was played by the Salvation Army in the late 1880s. In 1892, a set of new lyrics were written by Tomiya Tetsumaru to make the song more oriented to other Japanese marching songs, renaming it "Masuratake wo". In 1919, Masuratake wo was parodied with lyrics by Soeda Azenbō and Shogetsu Watanabe as "Tokyo Bushi (Pai no Pai no Pai)", which subsequently became a perennially popular shin min'yō standard. The song was featured in the soundtrack to the film The Flower and the Angry Waves by Seijun Suzuki.

The Finnish protest song "Laiva Toivo, Oulu" is set to the melody of "Marching Through Georgia", but with Finnish-language lyrics criticizing the actions of the captain of the titular frigate Toivo.

The song is referenced in the title of two alternate history novels. S. M. Stirling's Marching Through Georgia references the title, and Ward Moore's Bring the Jubilee references the chorus.

In 1924, guitar and harmonica player Charlie Oaks released "Marching Through Flanders" for the Vocalion label (Vocalion 15104). It bears an identical melody to "Marching Through Georgia", but details the exploits of American troops in Belgium during World War I.

In the early 1940s during the Japanese rule of Korea, the Korean Liberation Army used the melody of "Marching Through Georgia" for their "March of the KLA". 

In the classic western movie Shane (1953), ex-Confederate Frank "Stonewall" Torrey (Elisha Cook, Jr.) is goaded by another, harmonica-playing, character with an impromptu rendition of "Marching Through Georgia". In the 1966 Howard Hawks western El Dorado, the character Bull, in response to being shot at from a bell-laden church tower and then asked to provide cover, proclaims, "Well, just give me another gun and I'll play "Marching Through Georgia."

In 1961, Tennessee Ernie Ford sang this song on his album Tennessee Ernie Ford Sings Civil War Songs of the North.

The Stockton, California band Pavement emphatically reference Sherman's March to the Sea and song "Marching Through Georgia" in their song "Unseen Power of the Picket Fence" from their 1994 album reissue Crooked Rain, Crooked Rain: LA's Desert Origins.

Lyrics

Adaptations

"Come In"
One version of the chorus for Come In is as follows:

The Land
The first verse and chorus from "The Land" is as follows:

"Paint 'Er Red"
One verse from this adaptation, occasionally sung by members of the Industrial Workers of the World, is as follows:

The song was interpolated into The United States of America's "The American Metaphysical Circus".

"Shout aloud Salvation"
The Salvation Army has a tradition of adapting songs with their own Christian words. These words written by George Scott Railton

See also

Notes

References

Bibliography

Further reading

External links

 "Marching Through Georgia", Harlan & Stanley (Edison Gold Moulded, 1904)—Cylinder Preservation and Digitization Project
 Marching Through Georgia sheet music
 Marching Through Georgia MIDI
 Marching Through Pretoria recording at Flatinternational.org   flatinternational - south african audio archive - Ian Colquhoun - Marching on Pretoria

1865 songs
American patriotic songs
Georgia (U.S. state) in the American Civil War
Sherman's March to the Sea
Songs of the American Civil War
Songs written by Henry Clay Work
Songs about Georgia (U.S. state)
American military marches